Breadalbane may refer to:

Australia 

Breadalbane, New South Wales, a village
Breadalbane, Queensland, a locality in the Whitsunday Region
Breadalbane, Tasmania, a town

Canada 

 Breadalbane, a community within the village of Blackville, New Brunswick
 Breadalbane, Prince Edward Island, a community in Canada

United Kingdom 

Breadalbane, Scotland, an area of the Scottish Highlands
Breadalbane (ship), a British merchant ship
 The Earl of Breadalbane and Holland
 The Marquess of Breadalbane